Isochrysidaceae is a family of algae in the clade Haptophyta. It contains feedstock microalgae such as Isochrysis galbana.

Genera 
Chrysidalis
Chrysonema
Dicrateria
Erkenia
Isochrysis
Pseudoisochrysis
Ruttnera
Scintilla
Tessella
Tisochrysis

References 

Haptophyte families
Eukaryote families